False Sandalwood is a common name for several plants and may refer to:

 Adenanthera pavonina, false red sandalwood 
 Eremophila mitchellii, a shrub or small tree native to Australia
 Myoporum platycarpum, endemic to Australia
 Myoporum sandwicense, endemic to Hawaiʻi